Negeşti may refer to several villages in Romania:

 Negeşti, a village in Scărişoara Commune, Alba County
 Negeşti, a village in Cotmeana Commune, Argeș County